Talen Energy is an independent power producer founded in 2015. It was formed when the competitive power generation business of PPL Corporation was spun off and immediately combined with competitive generation businesses owned by private equity firm Riverstone Holdings.  Following these transactions, PPL shareholders owned 65% of Talen's common stock and affiliates of Riverstone owned 35%. As a condition for FERC approval Talen agreed to divest approximately 1,300 megawatts of generating assets in the PJM Interconnection Region to mitigate FERC's competitiveness concerns.  On December 6, 2016, Riverstone Holdings completed the purchase of the remaining 65% of Talen's common stock, making it a privately owned company.

History

According to the Director of Corporate Communications the name "Talen Energy" symbolizes talent of the people who work for the company and energy in terms of the product it produces and what employees bring to their jobs.  Talen "represents the idea of talented people energized to succeed."  The company's colors of green and yellow were chosen based on then-CEO Paul Farr's love of the Green Bay Packers.  Today, the company's logo is simply black and white.

On June 10, 2014, PPL announced that it would spin off its competitive energy business which would merge with Riverstone Holdings' operations to create Talen. The transaction needed approval from the Pennsylvania Public Utility Commission, the U.S. Department of Justice, the FERC, and the Nuclear Regulatory Commission before its completion.

On February 2, 2015, PPL and Riverstone accepted the FERC's mitigation option in order to receive approval from FERC.  The Pennsylvania PUC approval followed on March 11, 2015 when the PUC approved the transfer of PPL Electric Utilities' ownership in PPL Interstate Energy Company to Talen.  The NRC's approval for the transfer of the Susquehanna Nuclear Plant licenses came on April 10, 2015 and on April 23, 2015, PPL received the final regulatory approval from the U.S. Department of Justice.

Talen Energy launched on June 1, 2015. PPL shareholders initially owned 65 percent and Riverstone owned 35% of the shares of the new company, whose shares trade on the NYSE under the symbol TLN.

On June 2, 2015, Paul Farr, President and CEO of Talen, and other executives rang the opening bell on the NYSE in celebration of the Talen Energy launch.

On October 8, 2015, Talen announced the sale of Ironwood Natural Gas plant to a TransCanada subsidiary for 654 million USD, and Holtwood and Wallenpaupack Hydro plants to Brookfield Renewable Energy Partners of Hamilton, Bermuda for 860 million USD.

On December 6, 2016, Riverstone Holdings completed the purchase of the remaining 65% of Talen's common stock, making it a privately owned company.

On November 10, 2020, Talen announced its commitment to transform for a clean energy future.  As part of its transformation announcement Talen noted that it will decarbonize its fleet and invest in developing renewable energy, battery storage and digital infrastructure primarily on owned land within its footprint.  It also introduced its "Force for Good" philosophy, which includes maintaining its commitment to the communities in which it operates, by converting, rather than retiring its fossil generation facilities and creating new opportunities for these stakeholders through its transformation.  This announcement made Talen one of the first in the competitive power industry to commit to an accelerated transformation away from coal.  The Sierra Club expressed its support of Talen's actions.

Talen later reported further tangible steps made toward its goal of leading the clean energy transition and being a Force for Good.  In April 2021, It announced t hat it had entered into a joint venture with Pattern Energy to pursue the development, financing, construction and operation of approximately 1.4 Gigawatts of utility scale renewable energy projects over the next five years.  Then, in May 2021, Talen unveiled its 1 Gigawatt of battery storage project pipeline.  Both the renewable energy and battery storage projects will largely be constructed on land within Talen's footprint, creating new opportunities for its communities.  During its May 2021 ESG Equity Investor Day, Talen outlined plans to construct a digital infrastructure campus on owned land adjacent to its Susquehanna nuclear generation facility outside Berwick, Pennsylvania.  The campus would include facilities that would house data center and cryptocurrency mining operations.  Targeted tenants for the data center facilities would be organizations including Google, Amazon and Apple, to help facilitate data storage, cloud computing and processing.  As the demand for technology increases, so does the requirement for energy to power these applications.  Susquehanna's carbon-free power can offer a clean, reliable source of energy for clients and their applications.  The campus' first facility will host a 180 Megawatt bitcoin mining operation as part of Talen's joint venture with TeraWulf Inc.  The joint venture, Nautilus Cryptomine will develop up to 300 Megawatts of zero-carbon mining capacity.

On May 9, 2022, Talen filed for bankruptcy under Chapter 11 in an attempt to reduce its $4.5 billion debt.

Facilities and infrastructure
Talen is one of the largest competitive power generation and infrastructure companies in North America. The Company owns and/or controls approximately 13,000 megawatts of generating capacity in wholesale U.S. power markets, principally in the Mid-Atlantic, Texas and Montana.  

Talen's generation facilities include nuclear, coal fired and natural gas power plants. The largest plant is the Susquehanna Steam Electric Station, a 2,700 MWe nuclear power plant, located on the Susquehanna River seven miles (11 km) northeast of Berwick, Pennsylvania.

The following is a list of Talen's current generation facilities owned by subsidiaries of Talen:

Nuclear 
 Susquehanna Steam Electric Station - Berwick, PA

Coal 
 Brandon Shores Generating Station - Pasadena, MD
 Brunner Island Steam Electric Station (also burns natural gas)- York Haven, PA
 Colstrip Power Plant - Colstrip, MT
Conemaugh Generating Station - New Florence, PA
 Herbert A. Wagner Generating Station (gas co-fired) - Pasadena, MD
Keystone Generating Station - Schelocta, PA
 Montour Power Plant - Washingtonville, PA

Gas 
 Barney M. Davis Energy Center - Corpus Christi, TX
 Camden Power Plant - Camden, NJ
 Dartmouth Power Plant - Dartmouth, MA
 Laredo Energy Center - Laredo, TX
 Lower Mount Bethel Power Plant - Martins Creek, PA
 Martins Creek Power Plant - Martins Creek, PA
 Millennium Power Plant -  Charlton, MA
 Newark Bay Power Plant - Newark, NJ
 Nueces Bay Energy Center - Corpus Christi, TX
 Pedricktown Power Plant - Pedricktown, NJ

References

External links

Electric power companies of the United States
Companies based in Allentown, Pennsylvania
Energy companies established in 2015
Non-renewable resource companies established in 2015
2015 establishments in Pennsylvania
2016 mergers and acquisitions
American companies established in 2015
Companies that filed for Chapter 11 bankruptcy in 2022